Totton College is a further education college located in Totton, Hampshire, providing courses for mainly 16- to 19-year-olds as well as adult education courses. These include BTECs, NVQs, GCSEs and Access courses. Courses are also available to students aged 14 and above who would benefit from additional hands-on experience and training in addition to their mainstream learning. A range of accredited professional and leisure courses are available to adults both in the daytime and evening.

Opening in 1955 as Totton Grammar School, it became a sixth form college in 1969 and continued to expand their campus from the late 1980s onwards. Its main campus is off Water Lane in Totton, but it also has three other campuses in the Totton area and one other campus in the nearby Waterside area. The college previously offered a range of A-level courses but these were stopped from September 2015. The college merged with social justice charity, Nacro, in December 2015.

History

Totton Grammar School
Totton Grammar School opened as a secondary school in the spring term of 1955 and was run by the Hampshire County Council. The school actually started with a first year intake in September, but, as the building was not yet ready, all the students had to be bussed to Eastleigh County High School, as nearer schools were operated by Southampton and not Hampshire CC. All 45 were taught as a single class, mainly by a Miss Stevens. This was split into 2 classes on the opening of the school building, when Mr Stevens (no relation) became Head.

As with many other Grammar Schools, entry to the first year, or first form, was conditional on passing the national 11-Plus examination, normally at the age of 11 or 12. With a nationally fixed school-leaving age of 16, pupils generally went on to complete their O-level examinations in the fifth form. After that, the more academically-inclined pupils from any secondary school in the area could apply to stay on for a further two years, in what were known as the lower-sixth and upper-sixth forms, to sit A-levels.

In reference to the public school system, the first five forms were split into four houses, made up of one class per year, named Ash, Beech, Holly and Oak. Each one was given a colour (red, yellow, blue or green respectively) and was used as the competitive focus of sports days, quizzes, competitions, theatrical and musical events.

Totton College
When the government decided to change the secondary school system and to phase out the grammar schools, the decision was made for Totton Grammar school to convert itself to Totton Sixth Form College, and then to simply Totton College. The conversion started in 1969, the first Autumn without a first form, and was completed four years later, the first Autumn without a fifth form and hence with no lower school. The college became independent of the local authority in 1993.

At this point, the college started to expand outwards from the original school buildings with additional surrounding facilities. The Recreation Centre was built in 1988, accompanied by the Rugby Clubhouse for Tottonians Rugby Club in the late 1990s and the new Learning Resources Centre in 1998. At this point the college was starting to expand and required more teaching space. In addition to the rooms in the LRC, the new South Wing and Calmore Road entrance was constructed in 2003 and the college acquired the Hanger Farm site which was opened as an arts venue in 2004. The CoVE building for Foundation studies was constructed in 2006, the new student atrium in 2010 and a new building for Media and Hairdressing in 2012. The latest addition was a new entrance hall area which was completed in Summer 2013.

The college experienced a difficult changeover of principal in 2011, as demonstrated by an Ofsted report in September 2011 that reduced the college's status from the previous 'Good' in 2008 to 'Inadequate'. The college appealed the decision at the time but has since undertaken major changes in structure.

In 2015 it emerged that Totton college was in serious financial difficulties and was seeking a merger with another institution. In April it was announced that Totton College would no longer offer A-levels from September 2015 following the failure of take-over negotiations with Eastleigh College. In June 2015, it was announced that the college would merge with the social justice charity Nacro. The addition of Totton College to Nacro was announced as the second largest not-for-profit merger 2015/16 by The Good Merger Index.

Organisation

Leadership
Nacro's Director of Education and Skills, Lisa Capper, is the current Principal of Totton College, supported by Hannah Avoth as Vice Principal and Campus Lead. Prior to this, Dr Maxine Room CBE was Interim Campus Principal from October 2017, following previous Campus Principal Derek Headrige, who joined the college in April 2016. In April 2015 the interim Principal was Jo Landles. Previously The Principal was Mike Gaston who took over from  Mark Bramwell, who retired in June 2011 after 17 years.
 He was supported by Jo Landles, Vice Principal; Rob Dunford, Assistant Principal for Enterprise, Innovation and Business Development; and Alex Richards, Assistant Principal for College Services.

The college is governed by a Board of Governors that comprise the leadership team, members of staff, members of the public and parents and elected members from Totton College Students' Union who represent the student body.

Faculties
The college divides their subjects and courses into six distinct areas, five of which are referred to as faculties. Each faculty mostly grouped together inside the college, are awarded a distinct colour identification and are headed by a leadership structure. As of September 2013, these are:
Creative Industries - Art and Design, Beauty Therapy, Dance, Film and Media Production, Graphic Design, Hairdressing, Music, Performing Arts, Photography and Textiles. Coloured red with facilities above the refectory, the Media and Salon block, and the West and South Wings.
Humanities - Civilisation Studies, Criminology, Critical Thinking, English Literature and Language, Geography, Government and Politics, History, Languages, Law, Philosophy, Psychology, Religious Studies and Sociology. The Faculty also offers opportunities to access Higher education. Coloured blue with facilities in the East, South and West wings.
Science, Technology, Engineering and Maths (STEM) - Accounting, Biology, Business, Chemistry, Computing and IT, Economics, Electronics, Mathematics and Physics. The faculty also contains the Motor Vehicle Centre and offers opportunities to access higher education. Coloured green with facilities in the West and North wings.
Service Industries - Childcare, Health and Social Care, Physical Education, Public Services, Sport Science, Teacher Training and Travel and Tourism. The faculty also offers opportunities to access higher education. Coloured purple with facilities in the Learning Resource Centre, North, South and West wings.
Skills for Life - Independence Skills, Pathway courses, Skills towards work and Social Skills. Coloured orange with facilities in the CoVE building and the North and South wings.
Sports Academy - Basketball Academy, Football Academy, Golf Academy, High Performance Academy, Rugby Academy and Swimming Academy. Coloured yellow using the Recreation Centre facilities.

Facilities

Water Lane

The College's main campus is on the corner of Water Lane and Calmore Road. It is centered on a square courtyard, three sides part of the 1955 buildings and the final side, the South Wing, added in 2003. The north east, north west and south east corners of the quadrangle contain adjoining blocks and buildings. The North East corner has the Entrance atrium linking the Administration wing, the North West contains the student atrium connecting the CoVE building and the South East corner houses the Student lounge and refectory. Both the Student atrium and Refectory are student social areas and contain outlets of Costa Coffee. In addition to this main quadrangle, three buildings lie outside the rest of the buildings: the Learning Resource Centre to the North, the Recreation Centre to the East and the Media and Salon block to the West.

The Learning Resources Centre contains the college library, equipped with around 40 computers and netbooks and a collection of course-related books and journals as well as a range of Fiction and DVD materials. Other teaching aids include the newly created facilities for the Media department in the Media block, the science laboratories in the West wing and the various other specialised classrooms around campus. The campus is fully accessible and the Foundation rooms in The Cove are dedicated to the learning and support of students with learning disabilities.

The Recreation Centre, currently known as Totton Health and Leisure, is on site and is accessible to both students and members of the public. Jointly run by the college and New Forest District Council, it houses a 70 workstation Gym, a 25m swimming pool, a 12m learner pool, a sports hall and a dance studio. Other publicly accessible facilities include Forest First pre-school and the Opus Salon, which offers cheap hair and beauty treatment for everyone while providing experience for the students studying those courses.

Hanger Farm
The Hanger Farm Arts Centre is a facility in West Totton, managed by Totton College, and hosts a variety of events from drama, comedy, theatre and can be hired out for weddings or corporate use. Plans for the £1.5 million redevelopment of the farm into an arts centre began in 1999, was built over 2003 and opened in November 2004 following problems with the builder going into administration. It utilises the old eighteenth century barn of the farm and split it into three: meeting room at one end, a lounge and bar area and the theatre itself taking up half the barn. It is equipped with retractable seating and so the room can be used for both audience and floor events.

Other campuses
Totton College also operates other centres across the regions. The college operates a Motor Vehicle Centre at Trinity Court on the nearby Calmore Industrial Estate, for teaching students in automotive skills, which was opened in 2010. They also operate the Junction Centre, formerly St. Mary's Hall, on Junction Road in the centre of Totton and the Waterside Skills Centre on Lunedale Road, Dibden Purlieu, which both offer foundation and adult courses.

Transport
The Totton College campuses all suffer from a lack of car parking spaces and so the college encourages those travelling from further afield to use bus and rail services where possible. The main college campus is located on the route of the Bluestar 11 route between Southampton and West Totton and the First Southampton 10 route between Southampton and the college via Southampton General Hospital.

In addition to these services, Totton College also operates contracts with three bus companies to operate special services to certain areas operating around five times each day to arrive at college at the beginning of the day and to leave college at lunchtime and at the end of college. These are the Xelabus 701, 702 and 703 services to the Waterside area, the Wilts & Dorset X74 and X75 services to areas around Salisbury and Wiltshire and the Bluestar 706 service to the Romsey area.

The nearest train station to the college is Totton railway station and the college offers access to a shuttle bus to and from the station and campus.

See also
 List of schools in Hampshire
 List of further education colleges in Hampshire
 National Union of Students (United Kingdom)

References

External links
 Totton College homepage

Further education colleges in Hampshire
Educational institutions established in 1955
1955 establishments in England